Sand Canyon is a valley and community on the east side of the city of Santa Clarita in northwestern Los Angeles County, California.

Geography
The canyon is in the northwestern San Gabriel Mountains foothills, in the upper Santa Clara River watershed. It is located in the neighborhood of Canyon Country in the city of Santa Clarita.

In 2016, the canyon was the site of a major wildfire known as the Sand Fire.

Development
Sand Canyon is an equestrian community, with trails for horseback riding, and large, upscale estates - among the most expensive in the Santa Clarita Valley. Most homes in Sand Canyon are custom-built. The community includes Sand Canyon Country Club. Plans for a Sand Canyon resort and spa have encountered hurdles and criticism from residents.

References

San Gabriel Mountains
Santa Clara River (California)
Santa Clarita, California